Harry Theoharis (b. 1970) is a Greek politician, member of the Hellenic Parliament for New Democracy, and former head of the department of revenue during the Greek government-debt crisis. He previously served as Minister for Tourism in the Cabinet of Kyriakos Mitsotakis. He was first elected to parliament in January 2015 representing The River, but left the party in April 2016 and sat as an independent. He co-founded a small liberal party called Democratic Responsibility with former PASOK minister Alekos Papadopoulos in July 2016, but was expelled in October of the same year. He continued to sit in parliament as an independent before joining New Democracy's parliamentary group in December 2018, and was elected on the party's ticket in the 2019 election. He holds a MEng (Hon) in software engineering-first class from Imperial College, London, and has held high-ranking positions in companies of the private sector in Greece and abroad.  During 2011-2012, he served as secretary general for information systems and he is known for introducing new digital services to assist the public, helping reduce bureaucracy and its resulting costs. He later (2013-14) served as a secretary general for public revenues at the Greek Finance Ministry. There, he succeeded in meeting budget revenues and producing a fiscal surplus. He is also known for launching the Publicrevenue platform to increase transparency in public administration.

References

Greek MPs 2015 (February–August)
Greek MPs 2015–2019
Greek MPs 2019–2023
1970 births
Living people
Ministers of Tourism of Greece
Politicians from Athens

Politicians affected by a party expulsion process
Greek political party founders